The Sergio (Portuguese: Carbonado do Sérgio) was the largest carbonado and the largest rough diamond ever found. Like other carbonados, it is believed to be of meteoritic origin. 

It was then broken up into small  pieces as industrial diamond drills.

See also
 List of diamonds
 List of largest rough diamonds

References

Diamonds originating in Brazil
1895 in Brazil
Individual diamonds
Black diamonds